Kevin O'Brien a Gaelic footballer who has played for the Naomh Mearnóg club.

On 13 February 2014, O'Brien ruptured his anterior cruciate ligament while playing for DIT in the Sigerson Cup, which sidelined him for the rest of the 2014 season.

Honours
 Leinster Under-21 Football Championship (1): 2012
 All-Ireland Under-21 Football Championship (1): 2012
 Leinster Senior Football Championship (2): 2012, 2013
 National Football League (1): 2013

References

1991 births
Living people
Gaelic football backs
Naomh Mearnóg Gaelic footballers